Enchi is a town in Ghana. It is the capital of the Aowin Municipality. Other main towns in the Aowin District include Old and New Yakasi, Achimfo, Boinso, Jema, Omanpe, Sewum, Jensue, Yiwabra, Yiwabra Nkwanta, Nyankomam, Kwawu, Abochia, and Jomoro.

The current leaders include the Paramount chief Nana (Beyeman) Benbu I, of Aowin. The incumbent Municipal Chief Executive is Samuel Adu Gyamfi, while the member of Parliament Oscar Ofori Larbi.
   
The area includes Christian, Muslim, and traditional religions. Christian denominations include Catholic, Methodist, Presbyterian, Anglican, Seventh Day Adventist, Church of Pentecost, Assemblies of God, New Covenant Family Church (West Africa), Higher Grounds Chapel, and the Apostolic Church of Ghana.

Several natives recently named as exemplary for the youth to emulate include John Kwekucher Ackah, Former Member of Parliament, Richard Cudjoe and Ackah Essuman of the University of Cape Coast, Joseph Quainoo, first to be consecrated to the episcopate, Susana Esi Quainoo, Assistant Director I(G.E.S); Cobbinah, Rtd., Commissioner of Police; Mercy Nuamah, Victoria Aidoo-Afo, Principal of Enchi College of Education; Assistant Commissioner of Police Alex Quainoo, I/C Budget, S. B. Arthur, and several others.

Higher education schools include Brentu Senior High/Tech. and Enchi College of Education.
Enchi is the home of the district hospital, Enchi Government Hospital. There is also a sizable Presbyterian Health Center.

The largest river in the district is the Tano whose tributary, the Desue, flows in the middle of Enchi.

Cocoa bean farming is a large contributor to the local economy.

Populated places in the Western North Region